Marco Harboe Ramkilde (born 9 May 1998) is a Danish football player who plays as centre-forward for AaB.

Career

Club career
In 2016, Ramklide was called up for AaB first team. On 29 May 2016, he made his Danish Superliga debut against OB at EWII Park, replacing Christian Bassogog at the 59th minute.

Ramkilde left by the end of the 2018/19, where his contract expired. On 17 March 2020, Ramkilde joined Queens Park Rangers on an 18-month deal.  Ramkilde left after the 2021/22 season when his contract expired making one appearance.

On 28 September 2022, Ramkilde returned to AaB as a free agent, signing a deal until the end of the year.

International career
Ramkilde has represented his country at various age groups. He was a member of Denmark national under-17 football team in the 2015 UEFA European Under-17 Championship qualification. Since September 2016, he has been member of Denmark national under-19 football team and played in 2017 UEFA European Under-19 Championship qualification.

Club career statistics

References

1998 births
Living people
Danish men's footballers
Danish expatriate men's footballers
Sportspeople from Aalborg
Association football forwards
Denmark youth international footballers
Danish Superliga players
AaB Fodbold players
English Football League players
Queens Park Rangers F.C. players
Danish expatriate sportspeople in England
Expatriate footballers in England